Blackjack Creek (also known as Black Jack Branch) is a stream in Johnson County in the U.S. state of Missouri. It is a tributary of the Blackwater River.

Blackjack Creek was named for the blackjack oak trees lining its course.

See also
List of rivers of Missouri

References

Rivers of Johnson County, Missouri
Rivers of Missouri